Sai Madhav Burra (born 1973/1974) is an Indian screenwriter known for his work in Telugu cinema. He wrote dialogues for films such as Krishnam Vande Jagadgurum (2012). Malli Malli Idi Rani Roju (2015), Kanche (2015), Gopala Gopala (2015), Khaidi No. 150 (2017) and Gautamiputra Satakarni (2017).

In 2018, he won Best Dialogue Award for Gautamiputra Satakarni at 16th Santosham Film Awards and at 49th Cinegoers Awards in 2017.

Filmography

References

External links

Indian male screenwriters
Indian screenwriters
Living people
People from Guntur district
People from Tenali
Place of birth missing (living people)
Screenwriters from Andhra Pradesh
Telugu screenwriters
Year of birth missing (living people)